is a Japanese television series starring members of the idol group Hinatazaka46. The show follows the students daily lives as they attend a voice acting school. The show aired on Nippon TV at 1:00 AM to 1:30 AM on Thursdays, and was available on Hulu after it finished airing. The series is the third television series to feature Hinatazaka46, after Re:Mind and Dasada, but Koeharu! is the first to not include every member.

Premise 
Meiko Hinowa (Mirei Sasaki) decides to enroll in a voice acting academy named "Kirameki Academy" to audition for a role in her favorite manga series that is getting an anime adaptation. She befriends people at her dormitory and school as they all work towards their dream roles.

Cast

Hinatazaka46 
Attended the same high school as Meiko.
Aspires to be an idol.
Looks up to Meiko as a mentor.
Also appears as herself in the final episode.

Others 
 Keiko Toda as Meiko's grandmother

Episodes

Production 
The series was announced on March 27, 2021 during the second day of Hinatazaka46's 2nd anniversary concert.

Koeharu aired on Nippon TV between April 29 and July 1, 2021, and was available on Hulu after its broadcast. An accompanying talk show was also included on Hulu where Sarina Ushio, the narrator of the series, interviewed other Hinatazaka46 cast members.

Soundtrack 
The opening and closing theme song, "Koe no Ashiato", is included in Hinatazaka46's single "Kimi Shika Katan". In the storyline, there are also two musical groups who each record a song in the series' soundtrack:  by Maririn & Ruby (Konoka Matsuda and Suzuka Tomita), and "Hell Rose" by Chocola Chocola (Hina Kawata, Hiyori Hamagishi, and Mei Higashimura).

References

External links 
  - Nippon TV 
  

Hinatazaka46
2021 Japanese television series debuts
Nippon TV dramas